Fiorella Infascelli (born 29 October 1952) is an Italian film director and screenwriter.

Life and career 
Born in Rome, Infascelli is the daughter of the producer and director Carlo. After working as an assistant director for notable directors such as Luchino Visconti, Bernardo Bertolucci and Pier Paolo Pasolini, she debuted as director in 1980 with the TV-movie Ritratto di donna distesa. Her film The Mask was screened in the Un Certain Regard section at the 1988 Cannes Film Festival.

Filmography
 Ritratto di donna distesa (1980)
 Pa (1981)
 The Mask (1988)
 Zuppa di pesce (1992)
 Italiani (1998)
 Conversazione italiana (1999)
 Ferreri, I Love You (2000)
 Il vestito da sposa (2003)
 Era d'estate (2016)

References

External links

1952 births
Living people
Italian screenwriters
Italian women screenwriters
Writers from Rome
Italian women film directors
Film directors from Rome